Murder Is News is a 1937 Canadian-American mystery film directed by Leon Barsha.

Plot summary 
A rich businessman is murdered at his townhouse the night his wife plans to divorce him and marry a high-powered lawyer. One of four Quota Quickies directed by Leon Barsha for the British market in Victoria, B.C., during the summer and fall of 1937.

Cast 
John Gallaudet as Jerry Tracy
Iris Meredith as Ann Leslie
George McKay as Brains McGillicuddy
John Hamilton as David Corning
Frank C. Wilson as Tony Peyden
William McIntyre as Edgar Drake
Doris Lloyd as Pauline Drake
John Graham Spacey as Fred Hammer
Colin Kenny as Insp. Fitzgerald
Fred Baes as R.A. Snyder

External links 

1937 films
American mystery films
English-language Canadian films
American black-and-white films
Films directed by Leon Barsha
Canadian mystery films
Canadian black-and-white films
1937 mystery films
1930s English-language films
Columbia Pictures films
1930s American films
1930s Canadian films